Samboan, officially the Municipality of Samboan,  is a 5th class municipality in the province of Cebu, Philippines. According to the 2020 census, it has a population of 20,373 people.

Samboan is bordered to the north by the town of Ginatilan, to the west is the Tañon Strait, to the east is the town of Oslob, and to the south is the town of Santander.

History
Samboan is popularly known as an abbreviation of the word sinamboang as a form of fishing during the Spanish time.

However, Samboan in our historical papers is probably known to be Canamucan which is a territory under the Spanish encomienda system of the Spanish administration during their tenure and conquest. As time goes by, Canamucan becomes Samboan in the current usage.

Samboan is a small town on a hill. But it used to be a much bigger town, with Alegria under its territorial jurisdiction. In fact, people of Alegria were made to render forced labor for the construction of the Samboan church. It was only some time during the middle of the 1880s that those two towns were separated from Samboan (the towns of Ginatilan and Malabuyoc, which now lie in between, were created after the separation).

The municipality of Samboan is one of the emerging town in the island of Cebu. It is one of the resilient towns of the whole Philippines ranking 6th in the whole country per ranking under the competitive index of LGUs as of year 2017. It is also a two-time awardee for the National Seal of Good Local Governance from year 2016 and 2017. It is also a known awardee for the Child-Friendly municipality in 2016 and continuous to be so at present.

Geography

Barangays
Samboan comprises 15 barangays:

Climate

Demographics

Economy

Culture

Heritage buildings

One aspect of interest is that of Samboan's cultural heritage left by the Spanish conquerors.

St. Michael Archangel Church is one of the oldest Spanish-built churches in Cebu, made of coral stones. Today, it is a national protected heritage structure by the National Historical Commission. It has now a NHC permanent marker.

The Watch Tower is another Spanish structure, also made up of blocks of coral stones. It was built on the side of the hill to watch out for Moro invaders approaching the island. It is the tallest watch tower in the entire island of Cebu, and best preserved.

Connecting the beach area with the Spanish Watch Tower is St. Jacob's Ladder (Escala de Jacobe). From here, one can get a view of the Tañon Strait.

The Museo de Samboan is the old municipal building of Samboan which now housed items of Samboan's way of life during our history up to the present. It was converted into a museum when the New Samboan Municipal Hall was erected.

The Samboan WWII Volunteers Monument, at the center of Poblacion on the National Highway, was built in honor of the many volunteers who fought for the freedom of the Philippines.

The San Sebastian Stone Walls are old stone structures near San Sebastian Parish Church. This may be why this barangay is popularly known as 'Bato' (meaning "stone").

The Spanish Boundary Post. It stands along the highway in Tangbo beside the Tangbo—Bonbon River Bridge. It was believed that it used to mark the boundary limit of old Poblacion but now merely serves to mark the boundary between Bonbon and Tangbo barangays.

Tourism

Natural attractions 

Samboan is known for its beautiful crystal clear waters with a rich marine ecosystem along its coastal barangays.

Colase Marine Sanctuary is managed by the municipality together with a fisherfolks organization. Here one can visit the fish sanctuary or dive for a fee to experience the most preserved marine ecosystem where sharks, dolphins and whales in the shallowest part of the foreshore. Aside from Colase, other coastal barangays including San Sebastian (Bato), Dalahikan, Tangbo, Bonbon, Suba and Poblacion offer the same experience generally.

Aguinid Waterfalls in Tangbo comprises five different tiers along Tangbo river. Each tier has a unique waterfall. One can never reach the peak or last waterfall without climbing the limestone walls of each waterfall from the lowest to highest.

Bonbon Binalayan Hidden Falls to the immediate south of Poblacion which some visitors call the Triple Drop Falls.

Ponong Hidden Lake is a small enclosed lagoon with a brackish water. It is unique in the sense that here is where a certain kind of bird – the "manolong" – dives into its salty waters and stays under for a long time in order to escape hunters. Today, it is perfect for relaxation, bird watching, fish feeding and firefly watching.

Balayg Sawa Falls has a waterfall located in the heart of Samboan covered with lush forest greens. It is along the river shared by Poblacion and Bonbon. It is home to protected species including bats and siloys not to mention some local plants and trees.

Mt. Bartolina situated in between Bulangsuran and Canang (Oslob) is where one can climb the peak and see both sides of Cebu, facing Bohol Strait to the east and Tañon Strait to the west. Bartolina is the highest peak in the south of Cebu where the panoramic view of north and south Bais Bay and the rest of Negros, Siquijor, and Bohol islands can be seen.

Dau Falls is the highest waterfall in Samboan. It is located in Barangay Suba.

Tabon Falls is a recently developed natural spot found between Tangbo and Bonbon.

Town Fiesta

The town fiesta is celebrated each 29–30 September in honor of the patron saint, Michael (San Miguel, ang Arkanghel).

Delicacies

Torta Especial (with or without coco wine) and Samboan cookies, which usually come out best during fiesta for visitors to try.
Torta de Tangbo is said to be among the best in the locality.
Manokhang is a native chicken cooked under coconut milk with hot pepper and "ulang" (Freshwater Shrimp).
Linubihang Kagang is a common specialty in town from "kagang" (Land Crab) cooked with "tuno" (coconut milk).
Tabanglang is a native dish made from sauteed "tabangka" (Snail) and "Ulang" (Freshwater Shrimp). It is a good appetizer.
Coco Maize Pudding is locally known as "kalo-kalo" with coconut meat and corn flour (tiktik). It is a dessert served hot & cold.

References

Sources

External links

 [ Philippine Standard Geographic Code]

Municipalities of Cebu